Rudná is a town in Prague-West District in the Central Bohemian Region of the Czech Republic. It has about 5,100 inhabitants.

Geography
It lies in the Prague Plateau.

History
Rudná was established in 1951 when two old villages of Dušníky and Hořelice merged into a new municipality. Its new artificial name is derived from the Czech word ruda (i.e. "ore") and commemorates a long history of iron ore mining in the region. Rudná was promoted to a town in 2000.

Demographics

Transport
Rudná is located along an old road from Prague to Beroun and Plzeň. Nowadays the parallel D5 motorway runs just north of the town.

Sights

The Church of the Beheading of Saint John the Baptist is a valuable Baroque church, probably built according to the plans of Kilian Ignaz Dientzenhofer.

The Church of Saint George is a neo-Gothic church from the beginning of the 20th century. It replaced an old dilapidated Baroque church.

The Hořelice Castle is belongs to the landmarks of Rudná. Today this Baroque castle is privately owned and inaccessible.

Notable people
Radek Šírl (born 1981), footballer

References

External links

Cities and towns in the Czech Republic
Populated places in Prague-West District